Dubeč is a municipal district (městská část) and cadastral area (katastrální území) in Prague. It is located in the eastern part of the city. As of 2008, there were 2,971 inhabitants living in Dubeč.

The first written record of Dubeč is from the 11th century. The village became part of Prague in 1974.

External links 
 Praha-Dubeč - Official homepage

Districts of Prague